Ikaeria is a genus of two species of crustose lichens in the family Teloschistaceae. Both species grow on twig bark of shrubs and trees. It was circumscribed in 2017 by lichenologists Sergey Kondratyuk, Dalip Kumar Upreti, and Jae-Seoun Hur, with Ikaeria aurantiellina assigned as the type species. This lichen was previously placed in the genus Caloplaca, but molecular phylogenetic analysis showed that it belonged in a lineage that was genetically distinct from that genus. Ikaeria serusiauxii was added to the genus in 2020.

Ikaeria has a sister group relationship with genus Yoshimuria; both are in the subfamily Caloplacoideae of the Teloschistaceae. Ikaeria is named in honour of Swedish lichenologist Ingvar Kärnefelt.

Species
Ikaeria aurantiellina  – Canary Islands
Ikaeria serusiauxii  – Macaronesia and mainland Portugal

References

Teloschistales
Lichen genera
Taxa described in 2017
Teloschistales genera
Taxa named by Dalip Kumar Upreti
Taxa named by Sergey Kondratyuk